The Creative MuVo (in some markets, formerly Creative NOMAD MuVo) is a range of digital audio players produced by Creative Technology Limited, launched in 2002. Most models in the MuVo range use flash memory for storing data; the only exceptions being the MuVo² and MuVo² FM models, which use microdrives.

The distinguishing feature of the range, beginning with the original MuVo and carried on to newer models, is that the players are split into two unequal parts. The smaller part functions as the audio player, bearing all the controls, inputs and outputs, internal microphone, and a male USB-A plug. The larger part has a female USB-A receptacle, and holds one AAA battery: this provides power to the player. The player/flash drive section is a USB mass storage device, therefore it requires no drivers on most operating systems. Data files, as well as audio files, can be stored on the flash memory, therefore the player can also be used as a USB flash drive. However, players like the MuVo², MuVo² FM, MuVo² XT, MuVo Slim, and the MuVo Vidz are an exception. The MuVo N200 looks like a typical MuVo player, but the two unequal parts are merged and inseparable. Many, but not all, models also include an internal microphone, allowing the device to be used as a low-quality audio recorder. The MuVo line was discontinued in 2009.

Models

Most models share a similar shape and design, except for the players listed above.

See also
 Creative Technology Limited
 Creative NOMAD
 Creative ZEN

External links
Creative Labs - MuVo Players

Digital audio players
Portable media players
Creative Technology products
Singaporean brands
Consumer electronics brands
Screenless digital audio players